Cupidesthes lithas, the Volta ciliate blue, is a butterfly in the family Lycaenidae. The species was first described by Hamilton Herbert Druce in 1890. It is found in Guinea, Sierra Leone, Liberia, Ivory Coast, Ghana, southern Nigeria, Cameroon, Gabon, the Democratic Republic of the Congo (Ituri, Équateur, Kinshasa, Kasai and Lualaba) and Uganda. The habitat consists of forests.

References

Butterflies described in 1890
Lycaenesthini
Butterflies of Africa